The 1981 Humboldt State Lumberjacks football team represented Humboldt State University during the 1981 NCAA Division II football season. Humboldt State competed in the Far Western Conference (FWC).

The 1981 Lumberjacks were led by head coach Bud Van Deren in his 16th season. They played home games at the Redwood Bowl in Arcata, California. Humboldt State finished with a record of six wins and four losses (6–4, 3–2 FWC). The Lumberjacks outscored their opponents 204–198 for the season.

Schedule

Notes

References

Humboldt State
Humboldt State Lumberjacks football seasons
Humboldt State Lumberjacks football